Castle Without is an electoral ward comprising the Windsor town centre. It is represented by three councillors (George Bathurst, Catherine Bursnall and Sue Evans of the Conservative Party) in the Royal Borough of Windsor and Maidenhead. Nationally, the ward forms part of the UK Parliamentary constituency of Windsor and is represented by Adam Afriyie of the Conservative Party.

When the electoral register was updated following the 2011 annual canvass, there were 5,109 voters appearing on the roll for the ward.

History
Prior to the 2003 Royal Borough elections, the Windsor town centre belonged to the Castle electoral ward before 2003.

For the 2003 Royal Borough elections, the remaining area of the Castle ward which was not included in the newly created Eton and Castle ward was transferred to the new Castle Without ward for the 2003 elections.

Electorate

The number of registered voters (British, Irish, European Union and Commonwealth citizens aged 16 or over) appearing on the electoral roll published for the ward are as follows:

 1 December 2009: 4,765 electors
 1 December 2011: 5,109 electors

Royal Borough representation
The two seats for the councillor representing the ward in the Royal Borough are determined by the Multi-member plurality system (the two candidate who receive the plurality of the votes cast). Royal Borough elections are held every four years.

Past elections results

See also
Windsor and Maidenhead local elections

References

Wards of the Royal Borough of Windsor and Maidenhead
Windsor, Berkshire